Gioachino is a masculine Italian given name. Notable people with the name include:

Gioachino Greco (1600–c. 1634), Italian chess player
Gioachino Rossini (1792–1868), Italian composer

See also
Gioacchino

Italian masculine given names